Viștea Mare is a mountain peak in the Făgăraș Mountains of the Southern Carpathians of Brașov County in Romania, with an elevation of . It is the third highest peak in Romania after Moldoveanu Peak (2544m) and Negoiu Peak (2535m).

External links
 Vistea Mare Peak and many other photos from the Romanian Carpathians
   Salvamontvictoria.com

Mountains of Romania
Mountains of the Southern Carpathians